Carlos Suárez may refer to:
 Carlos Suárez (cinematographer) (19462019), Spanish cinematographer
 Carlos Suárez (basketball) (born 1986), Spanish professional basketball player
 Carlos Suárez (footballer) (born 1992), Venezuelan football player
 Carlos Suárez (boxer) (born 1993), American-Trinidadian boxer